2009 Oakland Riots can refer to:
 January 7th riots in Oakland, California
 February 1st riots in Oakland, Pittsburgh